Canada–Hungary relations are the bilateral relations between Canada and Hungary, the importance of which centres on the history of Hungarian migration to Canada. Approximately 300,000 Canadians have Hungarian ancestry. Both nations are members of NATO, the OECD and the United Nations.

History

The first contact between Canada and Hungary was through Hungarian migrants immigrating to Canada in the early 19th century and settling mainly in Ontario and in the Prairie Provinces. In 1867, Canada became a confederated state and that same year, Hungary joined Austria and created the Austro-Hungarian Empire. Initially, all official contact between Canada and the empire was conducted via-London.

In August 1914, the United Kingdom declared war on the Austro-Hungarian Empire and Germany. Canada joined British forces and fought together during World War I. At the end of the war in 1918, Hungary became an independent nation. During World War II, Canadian and Hungarian troops fought against each other during the Western Allied invasion of Germany. At the end of the war, Hungary became a communist state. Between 1948 and 1952 some 12,000 postwar displaced Hungarians arrived to Canada.

As a result of the Hungarian Revolution of 1956, over 30,000 Hungarians left Hungary in 1956 and 1957 and emigrated to Canada which was one of the few countries to receive them. In 1964, Canada and Hungary officially established diplomatic relations and in 1965, Canada sent its first resident ambassador to Hungary. In 1989, Hungary became a free and democratic country and in July 1990, occupying Soviet troops left the country. There have also been several high-level visits between both countries. During the 1990s, the Canadian government spent money on advertisements in Hungary in order to dissuade Hungarians from immigrating to Canada.

In 2014, Canada and Hungary celebrated 50 years of diplomatic relations.

High-level visits
High-level visits from Canada to Hungary

 Governor General Ray Hnatyshyn (1993)
 Prime Minister Paul Martin (2004)
 Governor General Michaëlle Jean (2008)

High-level visits from Hungary to Canada

 President Árpád Göncz (1991)
 Prime Minister Viktor Orbán (1999)
 President László Sólyom (2007)

Bilateral relations
Both nations have signed several bilateral agreements such as an Agreement on the Enhancement and Protection of Foreign Investments (1991), Agreement on the Elimination of Double Taxation (1992), Criminal Legal Aid Treaty (1995), and an Agreement on Aviation (1998).

Transport
There are direct flights between Budapest and Toronto with Air Canada Rouge.

Trade
In 2018, trade between Canada and Hungary totaled $871 million Canadian dollars. Canada's main exports to Hungary include: electrical machinery, vehicles, optical and medical equipment and plastics. Hungary's main exports to Canada include:  machinery, pharmaceutical products, electrical machinery, vehicles, and optical and medical equipment. Canadian company Linamar, one of Canada's largest automobile industry suppliers, employs 2,300 workers in Hungary and is expanding its operations in the country. In October 2016, Canada and the European Union (which includes Hungary) signed a free trade agreement known as the "Comprehensive Economic and Trade Agreement".

Resident diplomatic missions
 Canada has an embassy in Budapest.
 Hungary has an embassy in Ottawa and a consulate-general in Toronto.

See also
 Embassy of Canada, Budapest
 Embassy of Hungary, Ottawa
 Hungarian Canadians

References 

 
Hungary
Bilateral relations of Hungary